Royal Consort Ik of the Gaeseong Wang (Han) clan was the 4th wife of her eleventh cousin, King Gongmin of Goryeo as they were same descents from King Hyeonjong and Queen Wonhye.

Marriage and Palace life
In October 1366 (15th year reign of Gongmin), he took Wang as his Queen Consort as he didn't have any issue from his first-marriage. Then, in December, she become Ik-Bi (익비, 益妃) and given the new surname as Han (한씨, 韓氏). Later in May 1367, along with Consort An, they went to Gorari (고라리, 高羅里) and watched Gyeoggu Game (격구놀).

However, in 1373 (21st year reign of King Gongmin), his first wife, Queen Noguk died and this make he had a heart attack, then had his other wives raped by a group of young and handsome men in order wanted to had an issue. At this time, Gracious Consort Yi, Consort Yeom and Consort An were refused this order to the end, and Ik-Bi initially refused it, but Gongmin threatened her with a sword and she was forced to had a relationship with Han-An (한안), Hong Ryun (홍륜), Gwon Jin (권진), Hong Gwan (홍관) and No Seon (노선) under Gongmin's guised. Forced to do this, Ik-Bi pretended not to be able to overcome this and joined them with followed his command and also continued to had a relationship. Know this, Yun Ga-gwan (윤가관) who disobeyed the King's command to had a relationship with her along with those two self-defense committee member, became a delinquent for a while.

In 1374, she finally pregnant Hong-Ryun's child and when Choi Man-saeng (최만생) announced this news to the King, Gongmin was overjoyed but in the other hand, he plotted to kill Hong who was this child's biological father. Then, Choi reported this to Hong's group and later, on 22 September, they assassinated Gongmin in his sleep-time. Hong was eventually assassinated by Yi In-im (이인임) related forces and then Ik-Bi gave birth their daughter on 1 October (lunar calendar).

In 1390 (2nd year reign of King Gongyang), the former consort (Ik-Bi) was given a land by the king after she raised his youngest daughter, Princess Gyeonghwa at her own mansion.

Family 
 Father - Wang Ui, Internal Prince Deokpung (왕의 덕풍부원군)
 Grandfather - Wang Geo, Grand Prince Hwaui (왕거 화의대군)
 Husband - Wang Jeon, King Gongmin (고려 공민왕) (23 May 1330 - 27 October 1374)
 Father-in-law - Wang Man, King Chungsuk (고려 충숙왕) (30 July 1294 - 3 May 1339)
 Mother-in-law - Queen Gongwon of the Namyang Hong clan (공원왕후 홍씨) (25 August 1298 - 12 February 1380)
 Issue
 Illegitimate daughter - Lady Hong of the Namyang Hong clan (남양 홍씨) (? - 1376); conceived by Hong Ryun (홍륜, 洪倫) (? - 1374) 
 Son-in-law - Kim Taek-jeong (김택정, 金澤精) of the Gimhae Kim clan (김해 김씨)
 Grandson - Kim Deok-ryeong (김덕령, 金德齡)

In popular culture

TV series
Portrayed by Lee Ji-eun in the 2005 MBC TV series Shin Don.
Portrayed by Lee So-yoon in the 2014 KBS1 TV series Jeong Do-jeon.

Film
Portrayed by Song Ji-hyo in the 2008 South Korean Movie A Frozen Flower.

References

External links
 
Royal Consort Ik on Encykorea .
Royal Consort Ik on Goryeosa .

14th-century births
14th-century deaths
Royal consorts of the Goryeo Dynasty
14th-century Korean women